Miloš Ćulafić (born ) is a Montenegrin male volleyball player. He is part of the Montenegro men's national volleyball team. On club level he plays for OFI V.C in Greece.

Clubs
 Budvanska Rivijera Budva (2008–2010)
 Suwon KEPCO 45 (2010–2011)
 Stade Poitevin Poitiers (2011–2012)
 VK Tioumen (2012–2013)
 Suwon KEPCO 45 (2013-2014)
 Budvanska Rivijera Budva (2014)
 Arago de Sète (2014–2016)
 Sazman Omran Sari (2016-)

References

External links
 profile at FIVB.org

1986 births
Living people
Montenegrin men's volleyball players
Suwon KEPCO Vixtorm players
VC Lokomotyv Kharkiv players